Tanga Airport  is a small domestic airport located in Tanga Region,  Tanzania. The airport is based in the regional capital city of Tanga. 

The airport has scheduled flights to Arusha, Dar es Salaam and the Zanzibar Archipelago islands of Unguja and Pemba.

The Tanga non-directional beacon (Ident: TG) is located on the field.

Airlines and destinations

Traffic and statistics

See also

List of airports in Tanzania
Transport in Tanzania

References

External links

Tanzania Airports Authority
SkyVector - Tanga Airport

Airports in Tanzania
Buildings and structures in Tanga, Tanzania